Patrick Juzeau (1950–2004) was a French classical violinist and conductor.

Biography 
Born in Bordeaux in a musical family, Juzeau began his musical studies very early.

For three years he worked at the Théâtre du Capitole de Toulouse as a violinist and obtained the Certificate of Aptitude as a violin teacher in 1972, then was appointed to the Pau Conservatory. He worked conducting with Jean-Sébastien Bereau, Pierre Dervaux, Jésus Etcheverry and Roberto Benzi. In 1976, he won the Émile Vuillermoz prize of the 26th Besançon International Music Festival.

He then became Roberto Benzi's assistant at the Orchestre National Bordeaux Aquitaine before being appointed permanent head of the Orchestre national des Pays de la Loire. He was then musical director of the Orchestre National de France, of Bordeaux Aquitaine, Capitole de Toulouse and Provence Côte d'Azur. In 1983, he was appointed an academic at the Conservatoire national supérieur musique et danse de Lyon. He conducted regularly in Spain where after having been assistant director of the San Sebastian International conducting course, he was appointed musical advisor of the Euskadi National Orchestra.
 

Juzeau died in 2004 in Bordeaux.

References

External links 

1950 births
2004 deaths
Musicians from Bordeaux
20th-century French male classical violinists
French male conductors (music)
Conservatoire de Paris alumni
Academic staff of the Conservatoire de Paris
20th-century French conductors (music)